Jae Hee (born Lee Hyun-kyun on May 25, 1980) is a South Korean actor. He is best known for his leading roles in the 2004 arthouse film 3-Iron and the 2005 television series Sassy Girl Chun-hyang.

Career
Jae Hee began his acting career as a child actor in the 1997 drama Mountain. He continued to appear on television, such as in the campus drama School 2 and the family sitcom Wuri's Family, as well as the 2000 horror film Bloody Beach.

In 2004, he was cast as the lead actor in Kim Ki-duk's 3-Iron, playing a silent young man who breaks into vacant houses and while living there for a few days, he cleans the house and repairs broken gadgets during his stay. The arthouse film won critical acclaim both locally and internationally. For his performance Jae Hee was named Best New Actor at the Blue Dragon Film Awards.

But Jae Hee's breakout role would come in 2005, when he played the playful but loyal Lee Mong-ryong in Sassy Girl Chun-hyang, a modernized romantic comedy based on the well-known folktale Chunhyangjeon. It became a huge hit not only in Korea, but throughout Asia, making him and co-star Han Chae-young into Korean Wave stars.

He followed that with action comedy film The Art of Fighting in 2006, in which he played a bullied high school kid who learns about martial arts and life from a wizened mentor (played by veteran actor Baek Yoon-sik).

Jae Hee returned to television, playing a chef in 2007's Witch Yoo Hee (in which he reunited with Chun-hyang director Jeon Ki-sang), and a surrogate father in 2008's One Mom and Three Dads, but those series were less successful ratings-wise.

On August 5, 2008 he enlisted for mandatory military service. He was assigned to the Defense Media Agency until his discharge on June 18, 2010.

For his first post-army project, Jae Hee was initially cast in Bravo, My Love!, but had to drop out after he sustained a back injury during windsurfing practice for the role. Instead, he starred as the chaebol heir of a cosmetics firm in cable romantic comedy Color of Woman, which aired on Channel A in 2011.

Jae Hee played the antagonist in May Queen, a 2012 generational epic set against the backdrop of the shipbuilding industry in Ulsan during Korea's modernization. He received an Excellence Award from the MBC Drama Awards.

In 2013, he joined period drama Jang Ok-jung, Living by Love, a revisionist take on the titular Jang, more infamously known as the royal concubine Jang Hui-bin. Initially cast as Jang Ok-jung's first love, his screen time was drastically reduced. Later that year, his Chinese film Crimes of Passion received a theater release three years after Jae Hee shot it in 2010.

Other activities
Jae Hee is currently running an online apparel shopping mall called Easy by Step, which he established in May 2007.

Personal life
After an article appeared in the South Korean magazine  that the presumed bachelor actor was leading a secret life, Jae Hee confirmed on October 23, 2012 that he had been married to a non-celebrity since 2010, and that he and his wife have a son. He said he did not reveal his marital status not because he was ashamed or hiding his family (the marriage and his son's birth were officially registered at the borough office), but because he wanted to be "private" and "protect his loved-ones."

Filmography

Television series

Film

Television shows

Awards and nominations

References

External links
 
 Jae Hee at Daum 
 Jae Hee  at Family Entertainment 
  
 
 

1980 births
Living people
20th-century South Korean male actors
South Korean male television actors
South Korean male film actors
South Korean male child actors
Dankook University alumni
21st-century South Korean male actors